Westworld is the first studio album by English post-punk band Theatre of Hate. It was released in February 1982 by record label Burning Rome, prior to the band's dissolution in 1983. It was produced by Mick Jones of the Clash.

Track listing

Release 

Westworld reached No. 17 on the UK Albums Chart.

Critical reception 

Westworld was generally viewed by critics as a disappointment in comparison to the group's previous work. AllMusic wrote, "Unfortunately, [Westworld] [...] is not as consistently brilliant as the singles that preceded it". Robert Murray, in the book The Rough Guide to Rock, called it "a work [...] heavy on atmospherics, but which ultimately failed to capture the live potency upon which the band's reputation had been built".

Personnel 
Theatre of Hate
 Kirk Brandon – vocals, guitar
 Stan Stammers – bass guitar
 John "Boy" Lennard – saxophone, clarinet
 Luke Rendall – drums

 Technical

 Mick Jones – production
 Jeremy Green – engineering
 Mark Freegard – assistant engineer
 Kev – cutting
 C·More·Tone Studios – album cover artwork

References

External links 

 

1982 debut albums
Theatre of Hate albums